The S6W reactor is a naval reactor used by the United States Navy to provide electricity generation and propulsion on warships.  The S6W designation stands for:

 S, Submarine platform
 6, Sixth generation core designed by the contractor
 W, Westinghouse was the contracted designer

History 
This pressurized water reactor was prototyped in the land-based S8G plant at Knolls Atomic Power Laboratory's Kesselring Site in West Milton, NY starting in March 1994.

Design 
It is believed to be able to utilize natural circulation at a large fraction of its full power without coolant pumps, which greatly reduces noise.

References

United States naval reactors